Hoplomorpha is a genus of moths of the family Oecophoridae.

Species
Hoplomorpha abalienella (Walker, 1864)
Hoplomorpha camelaea (Meyrick, 1888)
Hoplomorpha caminodes Turner, 1916
Hoplomorpha epicosma Turner, 1916
Hoplomorpha notatana (Walker, 1863)
Hoplomorpha teratopa (Meyrick, 1920)

References

Markku Savela's ftp.funet.fi

 
Oecophorinae
Moth genera